The 1972–73 Soviet Championship League season was the 27th season of the Soviet Championship League, the top level of ice hockey in the Soviet Union. Nine teams participated in the league, and CSKA Moscow won the championship.

Regular season

Relegation 
 Kristall Saratov – Traktor Chelyabinsk 2:3, 0:10

External links
Season on hockeystars.ru

1972–73 in Soviet ice hockey
Soviet League seasons
Sov